A mayoral election was held in the city of Makassar on 23 September 2013. The election was the second direct mayoral election in the city's history.

10 pairs contested the elections, including 4 independent tickets. With the incumbent barred from reelection after 2 terms, nearly 600,000 of the city's residents voted in the elections. Demokrat-backed architect Mohammad Ramdhan Pomanto secured a victory with a plurality of the votes.

Background
Makassar's first direct mayoral election was held in 2008, with incumbent Ilham Arief Sirajuddin winning his second term. The city's province, South Sulawesi, has been described by national and international observers alike as being rife with dynastic politics.

Initially, the election was planned for February 2014, but it was moved to 2013 in order to prevent interference with the national legislative and presidential elections. There were 983,900 eligible voters.

Candidates

Results

7,008 votes out of the 592,299 cast were invalid. During the results announcement, witnesses of the Supomo-Kadir pair walked out, claiming that the election had been a fraudulent one. Candidate pairs with ballot numbers 2, 7 and 9 sued Pomanto-Rizal in the Constitutional Court, but their demands to disqualify the winner and repeat voting were rejected in full.

Pomanto and Rizal were officially sworn in on 8 May 2014.

References

Elections in South Sulawesi
Makassar
Makassar